Estrée-Blanche is a commune in the Pas-de-Calais department in the Hauts-de-France region of France.

History

Indian cavalry were stationed at Estrée-Blanche during the First World War.

Geography

The small rivers Surgeon and Laquette converge at the commune.

Estrée-Blanche is found at the extreme edge of the coal-mining area of Nord-Pas-de-Calais. Part of its surface area was owned by the mining company, which ceased in the 1960s. All that remains of that era are some typical miners' houses.

It is one of many villages in the north of France bearing the name Estrées. The etymology of the name is from strata (cognate of English "street"), the word for the stone-layered Roman roads in the area (some of which turned into modern highways). Hence Estreti, village on the road which developed into Estrées.

Population

Places of interest
 The church of St.Vaast, dating from the sixteenth century.
 The fifteenth-century , built by the Le May family in 1443

See also
Communes of the Pas-de-Calais department

References

Estreeblanche